Gnaural is brainwave entrainment software for Microsoft Windows, Mac OS X, and Linux licensed under GPL-2.0-or-later. Gnaural is free software for creating binaural beats intended to be used as personal brainwave synchronization software, for scientific research, or by professionals. 

Gnaural allows for the creation of binaural beat tracks specifying different frequencies and exporting tracks into different audio formats. Gnaural runnings can also be linked over the internet, allowing synchronous sessions between many users.

See also 

 Brainwave Entrainment
 Binaural beats
 Linux audio software

External links
 
 https://www.youtube.com/watch?v=Nck9SX52qpU - A Gnaural Video Tutorial

Free audio software
Free science software
Free software programmed in C
Free health care software
Open source software synthesizers